Year 1360 (MCCCLX) was a leap year starting on Wednesday (link will display the full calendar) of the Julian calendar.

Events 
 January–December 
 October 24 – The Treaty of Brétigny is ratified at Calais, marking the end of the first phase of the Hundred Years' War. Under its terms, Edward III gives up his claim to the French throne, and releases King John II of France, in return for French land, including Calais and Gascony.

 Date unknown 
 King Valdemar Atterdag of Denmark reconquers Scania, which has been in Swedish possession since 1332.
 Shah Shuja regains rule of the Muzaffarid tribe in Persia after the death of his brother, Shah Mahmud.
 Nawruz Beg overthrows his brother Qulpa as Khan of the Blue Horde.
 Muhammed VI overthrows his brother-in-law, Ismail II, as King of Granada (in modern-day Spain); he is in turn overthrown this same year by the former king, Muhammed V.
 Dmitri Konstantinovich is installed as ruler of Vladimir (in modern-day western Russia) by the Khan of the White Horde.

Births 
 January 8 – Ulrich von Jungingen, German Grand Master of the Teutonic Knights (d. 1410)
 March 31 – Philippa of Lancaster, queen consort of Portugal (d. 1415)
 May 2 – Chu Ti, Yongle Emperor of China (d. 1424)
 June 24 – Nuno Álvares Pereira, Portuguese general (d. 1431)
 August 10 – Francesco Zabarella, Italian jurist (d. 1417)
 date unknown
 Amadeus VII, Count of Savoy (d. 1391)
 Bayezid I, sultan of the Ottoman Empire (d. 1403)
 Giovanni di Bicci de' Medici, Italian banker, founder of the Medici dynasty of Florence (d. 1429)
 Yi Jong Mu, Korean general (d. 1425)
 Andrei Rublev, Russian painter (d. 1430)
 Stanislaw of Skarbimierz, Polish religious writer (d. 1431)

Deaths 
 February 26 – Roger Mortimer, 2nd Earl of March, English military leader (b. 1328)
 September 16 – William de Bohun, 1st Earl of Northampton (b. 1319)
 September 29 – Joanna I of Auvergne, queen consort of France (b. 1326)
 November 4 – Elizabeth de Clare, English noblewoman (b. 1295)
 December 26 – Thomas Holland, 1st Earl of Kent
 date unknown
 David IX of Georgia, King of Georgia
 Geoffrey the Baker, English chronicler
 Isabella, Countess of Brienne, Countess of Lecce
 Nicephorus Gregoras, Byzantine historian (b. 1295)

References